Krystyna Skowrońska (born 22 July 1954 in Mielec) is a Polish politician. She was elected to Sejm on 25 September 2005, getting 16479 votes in 23 Rzeszów district as a candidate from the Civic Platform list.

She was also a member of Sejm 2001-2005.

See also
Members of Polish Sejm 2005-2007

External links
Krystyna Skowrońska - parliamentary page - includes declarations of interest, voting record, and transcripts of speeches .

1954 births
Living people
People from Mielec
Civic Platform politicians
Women members of the Sejm of the Republic of Poland
21st-century Polish women politicians
Members of the Polish Sejm 2001–2005
Members of the Polish Sejm 2005–2007
Members of the Polish Sejm 2007–2011
Members of the Polish Sejm 2011–2015
Members of the Polish Sejm 2015–2019
Members of the Polish Sejm 2019–2023
Maria Curie-Skłodowska University alumni